Beersheba Springs  is a town in Grundy County, Tennessee, United States. The population was 477 at the 2010 census. A resort town in the 19th century, Beersheba Springs was the summer home of author Mary Noailles Murfree. It now serves as a major summer meeting center for the Tennessee United Methodist Church.

History 

In 1833 Beersheba Porter Cain discovered a chalybeate spring. The spring and surrounding area, located above Collins River Valley, would be incorporated in 1839. Upon its incorporation, Beersheba Springs would serve as a summer resort with a small hotel and log cabins. The resort would be popular with stagecoach traffic that would travel between Chattanooga and McMinnville. It was notable for its mineral waters.   Eventually Louisiana farmers also moved into the area, leaving behind the notoriously hot summers of their home state. Beersheba Springs served as the summer home for Tennessee Mary Noailles Murfree.

Beersheba Springs resort
In 1854 Colonel John Armfield, a slave trader from Louisiana, acquired the property. Upwards of 100 slaves were brought to Beersheba Springs to work on Armfield's changes to the property: a new luxury hotel, cabins and grounds that would accommodate 400 guests. The resort would feature laundry facilities, ice houses, billiard rooms, and bowling alleys. French chefs were brought in to serve guests, as were musical acts from New Orleans.

A wooden observatory was built at the front of the hotel. From the observatory, guests could watch Confederate and Union armies battle during the Civil War. Eventually the threat of war, raids, and plundering would cause a decline in visitation to Beersheba Springs and the resort was handed over to Northern investors.

The resort would re-open in the 1870s but never returned to its former glory. In 1940, the Methodist Church purchased the resort and re-opened it for assembly and summer camps. Architecturally the resort remains unchanged besides, as of recently, parts of the hotel have been "modernized" or restored. The camp now serves as the home to the annual Beersheba Springs Arts and Craft Festival. In 1980 the resort area was placed on the National Register of Historic Places.

Geography

Beersheba Springs is located at  (35.467209, -85.671700).

Demographics

2020 census

As of the 2020 United States census, there were 434 people, 198 households, and 144 families residing in the town.

2000 census
As of the census of 2000, there were 553 people, 232 households, and 168 families residing in the town. The population density was 112.6 people per square mile (43.5/km2). There were 304 housing units at an average density of 61.9 per square mile (23.9/km2). The racial makeup of the town was 99.82% White, and 0.18% from two or more races. Hispanic or Latino of any race were 0.54% of the population.

There were 232 households, out of which 28.0% had children under the age of 18 living with them, 59.5% were married couples living together, 10.8% had a female householder with no husband present, and 27.2% were non-families. 23.7% of all households were made up of individuals, and 9.5% had someone living alone who was 65 years of age or older. The average household size was 2.38 and the average family size was 2.82.

In the town, the population was spread out, with 21.7% under the age of 18, 7.2% from 18 to 24, 26.0% from 25 to 44, 26.8% from 45 to 64, and 18.3% who were 65 years of age or older. The median age was 42 years. For every 100 females, there were 94.0 males. For every 100 females age 18 and over, there were 95.0 males.

The median income for a household in the town was $22,045, and the median income for a family was $26,250. Males had a median income of $27,083 versus $20,000 for females. The per capita income for the town was $13,691. About 26.9% of families and 32.5% of the population were below the poverty line, including 38.8% of those under age 18 and 26.4% of those age 65 or over.

Beersheba Springs today

The former resort serves as a retreat for the Tennessee branch of the United Methodist Church and the Arts and Craft festival. The Old Brown Museum, a former country store, now serves as a community museum documenting the history of Beersheba Springs. The town, with a population of 477, is the home to seven churches.

References

Towns in Grundy County, Tennessee
Towns in Tennessee
Spa towns in the United States
Populated places established in 1839